Islamic Research Center Bangladesh, popularly known as Bashundhara Islamic Research Center, is a higher Islamic research institution situated at Bashundhara, Dhaka. Faqihul Millat Mufti Abdur Rahman was the principal founder of the institution.

Departments
At present, Islamic Research Center Bangladesh offers Islamic education in the following fields of Islamic studies.

 Department of Fatwa (Darul Ifta)
 Department of Higher Islamic Law and Fiqh
 Department of Dawra-e-Hadeeth

References

External links
 Mufti Yousuf Sultan

Qawmi madrasas of Bangladesh
Deobandi Islamic universities and colleges
Islamic universities and colleges in Bangladesh